Sophronica albomaculosa is a species of beetle in the family Cerambycidae. It was described by Téocchi in 1986.

References

Sophronica
Beetles described in 1986